Thomas Horsfall may refer to:

Thomas Horsfall (politician) (1805–1878), Liverpool-based British politician
Thomas Coglan Horsfall (1841–1932), Manchester-based philanthropist